Pang Sheng Jun (born 4 September 1992) is a Singaporean national swimmer.

Early life and education 
Pang started swimming from the age of four upon doctor's recommendation due to his asthma. He began competitive swimming at six years old.

In 2014, he received an Outstanding Sports Achievement Award for swimming from the Singapore Sports School. He studied Sports Science and Management at the Nanyang Technological University.

Career
At the 2009 Southeast Asian Games (SEA Games) in Laos, Pang finished fourth in the men's 200m and 400m individual medleys. 

Pang participated at the 400m freestyle event, his only event, at the 2011 SEA Games. He finished fifth at the finals. Disappointed at his poor showing, Pang attempted suicide by attempting leaping off the highest floor of his apartment building at the Games Village but was held back by his teammate and friend, Russell Ong.

Pang won his first medal at the FINA Swimming World Cup with a bronze medal in the 1,500m freestyle event.

At the 2012 Southeast Asian Swimming Championships, he won the gold medal at the men's  freestyle.

At the 2013 SEA Games, he won the gold medal at the men's  freestyle.

At the 2014 Southeast Asian Swimming Championships, he won the gold medal at the men's  freestyle again, and bronze medals in the 200m and 400m freestyle events and the 400m individual medley event .

At the 2015 SEA Games, he won the gold medal at the men's  freestyle again and broke the national record. He also won the silver medal in the 400m individual medley event and the bronze medal in 400m freestyle event, his first individual medals in the SEA Games.

Pang failed to qualify for the 2016 Summer Olympics after achieving Olympic 'B' times in the 400m individual medley and freestyle.

Personal life
Pang is the youngest son of Agnes Ng and Pang Boon Teng. He has two sisters who swam competitively until they were 16 years old when they decided to focus on their studies instead.

References

1992 births
Living people
Singaporean male freestyle swimmers
Singaporean male medley swimmers
Singaporean sportspeople of Chinese descent
Swimmers at the 2010 Asian Games
Swimmers at the 2014 Asian Games
Swimmers at the 2018 Asian Games
Asian Games bronze medalists for Singapore
Asian Games medalists in swimming
Medalists at the 2014 Asian Games
Southeast Asian Games medalists in swimming
Southeast Asian Games gold medalists for Singapore
Southeast Asian Games silver medalists for Singapore
Southeast Asian Games bronze medalists for Singapore
Competitors at the 2013 Southeast Asian Games
Competitors at the 2015 Southeast Asian Games
Competitors at the 2017 Southeast Asian Games
21st-century Singaporean people